João Denoni Júnior or simply João Denoni (born February 2, 1994 in Taquaritinga) is a Brazilian football midfielder who plays for Mirassol.

Honours
Palmeiras
Copa do Brasil: 2012

References

External links

1994 births
Living people
Brazilian footballers
Sociedade Esportiva Palmeiras players
Oeste Futebol Clube players
Atlético Clube Goianiense players
Ituano FC players
Red Bull Brasil players
Mirassol Futebol Clube players
Campeonato Brasileiro Série A players
Campeonato Brasileiro Série B players
Association football midfielders
People from Taquaritinga